| lowest attendance   = 150Ulster Ravens 25–12 Aberavon(13 December 2014)
| tries               = 
| top point scorer    = Douglas Flockhart (Doncaster Knights)  89 points
| top try scorer      = Cian Kelleher (Leinster A)  9 tries
| venue               = Castle Park, Doncaster
| attendance2         = 3,115
| champions           = Worcester Warriors
| count               = 1
| runner-up           = Doncaster Knights
| website             = 
| previous year       = 2013–14
| previous tournament = 2013–14 British and Irish Cup
| next year           = 2015–16
| next tournament     = 2015–16 British and Irish Cup
}}

The 2014–15 British and Irish Cup is the sixth season of the annual rugby union competition for second tier, semi-professional clubs from Britain and Ireland.  Leinster A are the defending champions having won the 2013–14 final against Yorkshire Carnegie 44–17 at Donnybrook on 23 May 2014. There has been four different winners and five different losing finalists of the competition in the five seasons of its existence.

The format of the competition has been changed once again, with the Scottish withdrawing from the competition because of an increase, from four to six, in the number of the group matches before Christmas. Scottish Rugby felt that Scottish teams would not be able to compete fully in both the British and Irish Cup and the Scottish Premiership, the top-flight league for clubs in Scotland. The Welsh teams selection is based on regional play-offs involving the 2013–14 Premier Division clubs at the start of the season. This process yielded Pontypridd to represent the Cardiff Blues Region, Cross Keys to represent the Dragons Region, Aberavon to represent the Ospreys Region, and Carmarthen Quins to represent the Scarlets Region.

Matches in the competition proper were played on the same weekends as the European Rugby Champions Cup and European Rugby Challenge Cup.  First round matches began on 10 October 2014 and the final was held on 3 April 2015. Worcester Warriors beat Doncaster Knights 35 – 5 in the final held at Castle Park, Doncaster; the home ground of the Knights.

Participating teams and locations
The allocation of teams is as follows:
  – twelve clubs from RFU Championship
  – four Irish provinces represented by 'A' teams
  – four clubs from the Welsh Premier Division

Welsh qualification
The Welsh teams are selected, based on regional play-offs involving the twelve clubs from the 2013–14 Premier Division and played at the start of the season. Teams gained home advantage depending upon their finishing position at the end of last season.

Cardiff Blues Region
The two constituent clubs of the Cardiff Blues played in a one-off game to determine the region's representative in the Cup.

Dragons Region
The four teams that make up the Newport Gwent Dragons each played in semi-finals, with the winner of each progressing to play off for the opportunity to represent the region.

Ospreys Region
With three teams making up the Ospreys region, Aberavon and Neath faced each other first, with the winner going into the final play-off with Bridgend.

Scarlets Region
Like the Ospreys, the Scarlets region has three constituent clubs, so two teams played each other in a preliminary game for the chance to face the third team in the deciding match.

Competition format
The competition format is a pool stage followed by a knockout stage. The pool stage consists of five pools of four teams playing home and away matches. The top side in each pool, plus the three best runners-up, will progress to the knockout stage. The eight quarter-finalists will be ranked, with teams ranked 1-4 having home advantage. The four winning quarter-finalists will progress to the semi-final draw. Matches will take place on the same weekends as the European Rugby Champions Cup and European Rugby Challenge Cup cups.

Pool stages

Pool 1

Pool 2

Pool 3

Pool 4

 This match finished with a 35 – 34 victory to Cornish Pirates.  However, in the 72nd minute the match went to uncontested scrums as Pirates were unable to provide a front-row replacement for injured prop Tyler Gendall.  Pirates should have reduced to 14 men on the pitch, in accordance with the regulations but, instead, Gendall was replaced with fly-half Bertie Hokpin (who scored the winning try) and continued with 15 men.  The Organising Committee decided to award the match to Bedford with a 28 – 34 scoreline, the score at the time that the scums went uncontested. Pirates are considering an appeal. Pirates' appeal failed to overturn the decision.

Pool 5

Knock-out stage

Quarter-finals

Semi-finals

Final

Total season attendances 

Does not include Welsh qualification matches.

Individual statistics
 Note if players are tied on tries or points the player with the lowest number of appearances will come first.  Also note that points scorers includes tries as well as conversions, penalties and drop goals.

Top points scorers

Top try scorers

Notes

References

External links
  Unofficial British and Irish Cup website - latest news, teams etc

British and Irish Cup
2014–15 rugby union tournaments for clubs
2014–15 RFU Championship
2014–15 in Irish rugby union
2014–15 in Welsh rugby union
2014–15 in British rugby union